The  New York Giants season was the franchise's 65th season in the National Football League (NFL). After going 10–6 and suffering a heartbreaking final-day elimination from playoff contention in 1988, the team went 12–4 and won the NFC East. The Giants were upset by the Los Angeles Rams in the NFC Divisional playoffs.

Offseason

Draft

Regular season

Schedule

Standings

Game summaries

Week 1

Week 2

Week 7

Roster

Playoffs

The Rams upset the Giants with quarterback Jim Everett's 30-yard touchdown pass to Flipper Anderson with 1:06 gone in overtime. New York jumped to a 6–0 lead in the first quarter with two field goals by kicker Raúl Allegre. With 17 seconds left in the first half, Anderson caught a 20-yard touchdown reception from Everett to take a 7–6 lead. In the third quarter, Giants running back Ottis Anderson scored on a 2-yard touchdown. But in the fourth period, Los Angeles kicker Mike Lansford made two field goals to tie the game, the second one coming with 3:01 left in regulation.

Awards and honors
 David Meggett, NFC Pro Bowl selection
 Lawrence Taylor, NFC Pro Bowl selection

See also
List of New York Giants seasons

References

 New York Giants on Pro Football Reference
 Giants on jt-sw.com

New York Giants seasons
New York Giants
NFC East championship seasons
New York Giants season
20th century in East Rutherford, New Jersey
Meadowlands Sports Complex